Samantasimha (IAST: Sāmantasiṃha, r. c. 1282-1305 CE) was a king belonging to the Chahamana dynasty, who ruled the area around Javalipura (present-day Jalore in Rajasthan). During the later half of his reign, he and his son Kanhadadeva jointly ran the administration. The Delhi Sultanate raided the kingdom twice during his reign, but could not capture it.

Reign 
{
	"type": "FeatureCollection",
	"features": [
		{
			"type": "Feature",
			"properties": { "marker-symbol": "monument", "title": "Bhinmal" },
			"geometry": { "type": "Point", "coordinates": [72.2625, 25.0085] }
		},
		{
			"type": "Feature",
			"properties": { "marker-symbol": "monument", "title": "Budtara", "description": "Also known as Budhatra or Burtra" },
			"geometry": { "type": "Point", "coordinates": [72.7969, 25.3130] }
		},
		{
			"type": "Feature",
			"properties": { "marker-symbol": "monument", "title": "Chohtan" },
			"geometry": { "type": "Point", "coordinates": [71.0705, 25.4842] }
		},
		{
			"type": "Feature",
			"properties": { "marker-symbol": "star", "marker-color": "000080", "title": "Jalor" },
			"geometry": { "type": "Point", "coordinates": [72.1416, 25.1257] }
		},
		{
			"type": "Feature",
			"properties": { "marker-symbol": "monument", "title": "Juna Barmer" },
			"geometry": { "type": "Point", "coordinates": [71.5635, 25.2272] }
		},
		{
			"type": "Feature",
			"properties": { "marker-symbol": "monument", "title": "Sanchore" },
			"geometry": { "type": "Point", "coordinates": [71.7762, 24.7518] }
		},
		{
			"type": "Feature",
			"properties": { "marker-symbol": "monument", "title": "Sirohi" },
			"geometry": { "type": "Point", "coordinates": [72.8575, 24.8852] }
		}
	]
}
Samantasimha succeeded Chachigadeva on the throne of Javalipura. He was probably Chachigadeva's son, although this cannot be said with certainty. He is also known as Samvantasimha and Samyantasimha. The inscriptions issued during his reign give his title as Maharajakula.

According to the 17th century chronicle Nainsi ri Khyat, Samantasimha had at least two sons: Kanhadadeva and Maladeva. As the heir apparent, Kanhadadeva assisted his father in administration from at least 1296 CE onwards. The 1299 CE Chohtan inscription refers to their joint reign.

Khalji invasion 

According to the Gujarat chronicler Jinaprabha Suri, in 1291-92 CE (1398 VS), the Delhi Sultan Jalaluddin Khalji invaded the Jalore kingdom. Samantasimha's neighbour Sarangadeva, the Vaghela king of Gujarat, came to his rescue. Khalji's army advanced up to Sanchore, but was forced to retreat by the Vaghelas, who were perhaps concerned that the Delhi Sultan would invade Gujarat next.

In 1299, Jalaluddin Khalji's successor Alauddin Khalji sent an army to Gujarat, under the command of Ulugh Khan and Nusrat Khan. While returning from Gujarat, the Delhi army marched through the kingdom of Jalore. There, a section of the Delhi army rebelled against their commanders over distribution of the plunder from Gujarat. According to Munhot Nainsi, Samantasimha's envoys met the neo-Muslim rebel leader Mammushah (Muhammad Shah). Three days after this meeting, the Khalji army was attacked by the rebels from one side and by the Jalore army from the other side. The mutiny was ultimately crushed. Ziauddin Barani's Tarikh-i-Firuz Shahi (14th century) also describes the mutiny, but does not mention the Chahamana participation in the conflict. The veracity of Nainsi's account is doubtful, as he inaccurately states that Alauddin personally led the Gujarat campaign.

Inscriptions 

The following inscriptions dated to Samantasimha's reign have been found:

References

Bibliography 

 
 
 

Chahamanas of Jalor